Jean Barthe (22 July 1932 – 2 December 2017) was a French Rugby League and Rugby Union player.

Playing career

Rugby union
Jean Barthe was born in Lourdes and started his career at FC Lourdes. With this club, he won three French Championships, in 1956, 1957 and 1958, and one Challenge Yves du Manoir. He earned his first cap with the French national team on 29 July 1954 against Argentina at Buenos Aires. He was called for the 1958 France rugby union tour of South Africa. In 1959 he left FC Lourdes for rugby league.

Rugby league
Jean Barthe made his debut in rugby league with Roanne XIII in 1959 which he won the French Rugby League Championship in 1960 and the Lord Derby Cup in 1962. In 1963 he join Saint-Gaudens Bears. He won two other French Rugby League Championship and two Lord Derby Cup in 1966 and 1967 with AS Carcassonne. He captained the France national team during their 1960 Rugby League World Cup campaign.

References

External links

Rugby League Project stats

1932 births
2017 deaths
AS Carcassonne players
FC Lourdes players
France international rugby union players
France national rugby league team captains
France national rugby league team players
French rugby league players
French rugby union players
People from Lourdes
RC Roanne XIII players
Rugby league forwards
Rugby league props
Rugby league second-rows
Rugby union number eights
Saint-Gaudens Bears players
Sportspeople from Hautes-Pyrénées
Stade Bordelais players